The 1970–71 NBA season was the Celtics' 25th season in the NBA. They missed the playoffs for the second straight season.

Draft picks

Roster

Regular season

z = clinched division title
y = clinched division title
x = clinched playoff spot

Record vs. opponents

Game log

Awards and records
Dave Cowens, NBA Rookie of the Year Award
John Havlicek, All-NBA First Team
John Havlicek, NBA All-Defensive Second Team
Dave Cowens, NBA All-Rookie Team 1st Team

References

Boston Celtics
Boston Celtics seasons
Boston Celtics
Boston Celtics
Celtics
Celtics